Robert Max "Sugar" Cain (October 16, 1924 – April 8, 1997) was an American Major League Baseball pitcher with the Chicago White Sox, Detroit Tigers and St. Louis Browns between 1949 and 1954. He batted and threw left-handed. Cain was the pitcher who issued a base on balls to Eddie Gaedel, whose single plate appearance made him the shortest person to appear in a major league game.

Biography
Cain was born on October 16, 1924, in Longford, Kansas. He was signed to a contract with the New York Giants in 1943. Cain shut out the New York Yankees in his first major league start in 1949. On April 23, 1952, he matched one-hitters with Bob Feller and won, 1–0  at Sportsman's Park in St. Louis.

On August 19, 1951, St. Louis Browns owner Bill Veeck put the 3 foot, 7 inch Eddie Gaedel into the game with instructions to hold his bat on his shoulder and not swing. Cain later recalled: "I went out to the mound to start to pitch the bottom half of the first and as I was warming up, Eddie went over and got these little bats. We couldn't understand what was going on." In his crouch, Gaedel reportedly had a strike zone of 1 inches. Detroit catcher, Bob Swift, advised Cain to "keep it low." According to observers, Cain was laughing so hard at the prospect of pitching to Gaedel that "he's practically falling off the mound with each pitch." Cain proceeded to walk Gaedel on four straight pitches, all high.

Cain pitched five seasons in the major leagues with the Chicago White Sox (1949–1951), Detroit Tigers (1951), and St. Louis Browns (1952–1953), also appearing as a pinch-hitter in one game for the White Sox in 1954. Cain played in 150 major league games, with 140 appearances as a pitcher, for 628 innings, with a career record of 37–44 and an earned run average of 4.50.

After leaving baseball, Cain lived in Euclid, Ohio, for the last 40 years of his life, and died of cancer in Cleveland at age 72.

References
General
 ESPN - "Short on size, long on history"

Specific

External links

1924 births
1997 deaths
Major League Baseball pitchers
Chicago White Sox players
Detroit Tigers players
St. Louis Browns players
Birmingham Barons players
Bristol Twins players
Jersey City Giants players
Kansas City Blues (baseball) players
Manchester Giants players
Memphis Chickasaws players
Miami Marlins (IL) players
Minneapolis Millers (baseball) players
Mobile Bears players
Oakland Oaks (baseball) players
Ottawa A's players
Baseball players from Kansas
People from Clay County, Kansas
Deaths from cancer in Ohio